Ee Thirakkinidayil is a 2012 Malayalam film directed by Anil Kaarakkulam, starring Vinu Mohan and Muktha in the lead roles.

Cast
 Vinu Mohan as Ananthan
 Muktha as Savithri
 Shaju
 Geetha Vijayan
 Vidya Harish siva
 Harish siva
 Shobha Mohan as Ananthan's mother
Krishna
 Bijukuttan
 Janardhanan
 K. P. A. C. Lalitha
 Kalabhavan Shajon as Sadananthasn Pattikadu
 Sreelatha Namboothiri as Eliyamma
 Lakshmi Sanal as Nurse

References

External links 
review

2010s Malayalam-language films
2012 romance films
2012 films
Indian romance films